The Great Alligator River, originally Il fiume del grande caimano and also known as Alligators, Caiman, Big Alligator River and The Big Caimano River, is a 1979 Italian adventure film directed by Sergio Martino. In the film, an African God takes the form of a giant man-eating crocodile and attacks tourists at a newly built resort after it becomes angered by encroachment on its land. Filming took place during the summer of 1979 in Sri Lanka and Italy, and began on 3 June; filming was originally slated to start on 20 May.

Cast 
Barbara Bach as Alice Brandt (Voiced by Susan Spafford)
Claudio Cassinelli as Daniel Nessel
Mel Ferrer as Joshua
Richard Johnson as Prophet Jameson 
Romano Puppo as Peter
Anny Papa as Laura
Enzo Fisichella as Maurice, lover of Minou's mother
Lory Del Santo as Jane
Clara Colosimo as tourist

References

External links

1979 films
1979 horror films
Italian adventure films
Films directed by Sergio Martino
Films scored by Stelvio Cipriani
Adventure horror films
Natural horror films
Giant monster films
1970s monster movies
Films about crocodilians
Films produced by Luciano Martino
Films shot in Sri Lanka
Films shot in Italy
1970s Italian films